Altair Peak, at  above sea level is the seventh highest peak in the Pioneer Mountains of Idaho, United States. The peak is located in Salmon-Challis National Forest and Custer County.

See also

References 

Mountains of Idaho
Mountains of Custer County, Idaho
Salmon-Challis National Forest